Mikhail Labunets ru
 Larisa Lazutina
 Aleksandr Lazutkin
 Aleksandr Lays ru
 Andrey Lamanov ru
 Mikhail Lantsev ru
 Andrey Laptev ru
 Dmitry Larin ru
 Vladimir Lastochkin ru
 Aleksandr Lebedev ru
 Anatoly Lebed
 Pyotr Lebezhikhin ru
 Sergey Levashov ru
 Valery Legasov
 Vladimir Legoshin ru
 Igor Lelyukh ru
 Ivan Leonov ru
 Sergey Lipovoy ru
 Dmitry Lisitsky ru
 Leonid Lobas ru
 Yuri Lobov ru
 Oleg Lobunets ru
 Vladimir Loginovsky ru
 Yuri Lonchakov
 Saypuddin Lorsanov ru
 Mikhail Lukin ru
 Aleksandr Lutsenko ru
 Sergey Lysyuk ru
 Gennady Lyachin

References 
 

Heroes L